Chad Fredrick Wolf (born June 21, 1976) is a former lobbyist and former American government official who was named the acting United States secretary of homeland security in November 2019. His appointment was ruled unlawful in November 2020. Wolf was also the under secretary of homeland security for strategy, policy, and plans from 2019 to 2021.

A member of the Republican Party, Wolf previously served in several positions in the Department of Homeland Security (DHS), including as chief of staff of the Transportation Security Administration (TSA) and chief of staff to DHS secretary Kirstjen Nielsen. From 2005 to 2016, he was a lobbyist, helping clients secure contracts from TSA. Wolf was an architect of the Trump administration family separation policy in 2018, and was prominently involved in the deployment of federal law enforcement forces in Portland and elsewhere beginning in July 2020. In September 2020, a whistleblower accused him of having ordered staff to stop reporting on threats from Russia.

In November 2020, District Judge Nicholas Garaufis ruled Wolf's appointment unlawful, and overturned a set of Wolf's orders as "not an exercise of legal authority". Wolf resigned his post on January 11, 2021, after a number of similar court rulings.

Early life, education and career
Chad Fredrick Wolf was born to James B. (Jim) Wolf and Cinda Thompson Wolf in Jackson, Mississippi. He grew up in Plano, Texas. He graduated from Plano East Senior High School and then attended Collin College on a tennis scholarship. He then transferred to Southern Methodist University, where he earned a Bachelor of Arts in history.

Wolf worked as a staffer for Republican Senators Phil Gramm, Kay Bailey Hutchison, and then Chuck Hagel, for whom he worked for two and a half years. From 2002 to 2005, he worked in the Transportation Security Administration (TSA), becoming Assistant Administrator for Transportation Security Policy in 2005. It was during this time he first worked with Kirstjen Nielsen.

Lobbyist
From October 2005 to 2016, Wolf was vice president and senior director at Wexler & Walker, a now defunct lobbying firm. He helped clients obtain contracts from the TSA, his previous employer.

In 2013 he received a Master Certificate in government contract management from Villanova University. To avoid confusion with a Master's degree, Villanova University now simply refers to this as a Certificate in Contract Management.

Donald Trump administration
In March 2017 Wolf became the Transportation Security Administration's chief of staff. He served in that position for four months, then became DHS Deputy Chief of Staff and the top aide to Deputy Secretary Elaine Duke.

In July 2017, Wolf became DHS's chief of staff under Secretary Kirstjen Nielsen. While working for Nielsen, he was an early architect of the family separation policy. Under questioning from Senator Jacky Rosen, Wolf later testified to Congress that he was not involved in the policy's development and that his function was to provide information to Nielsen and "not to determine whether it was the right or wrong policy". A government watchdog group disputed this statement based on internal documents. Wolf has said he "supported the President's decision when he issued an executive order to stop that practice".

Wolf then became Assistant Secretary of Homeland Security for Strategy, Plans, Analysis & Risk, a Senior Executive Service position not subject to Senate confirmation. He concurrently served as Acting Under Secretary of Homeland Security for Strategy, Policy, and Plans. He was nominated in February 2019 to serve permanently as Under Secretary, and his confirmation hearing was held that June. Senator Jacky Rosen delayed the nomination to protest poor conditions for children at DHS facilities.

Acting Secretary of Homeland Security 
Wolf began serving as Acting Secretary of Homeland Security in November 2019. In November 2020, a federal court ruled his appointment unlawful and overturned a set of his orders as lacking "legal authority". Wolf resigned on January 11, 2021.

Appointment

Wolf's appointment as Acting Secretary of Homeland Security came after Kevin McAleenan's departure was announced on November 1, 2019. At the time, he was not considered the first choice for the job, and it has been reported that he was satisfied with his policy job at the time, but others favored by Trump such as Ken Cuccinelli and Mark Morgan were ineligible for the Acting Secretary position.

The fact that he had previously lobbied for the National Association of Software and Services Companies, which was in favor of the H-1B visa program, led to criticism from groups favoring more restrictive immigration policies. But the Trump administration defended his record and privately asked Republican senators not to oppose his appointment.

The administration waited for Wolf's confirmation as Under Secretary before appointing him Acting Secretary to avoid appointing him as a principal officer from a non-Senate-confirmed position, which many scholars and former government officials have argued is unconstitutional. DHS then had to move the Under Secretary position earlier in the line of succession, because the 210-day period in which an acting official was eligible to be named without a pending permanent nomination had expired. This, in turn, mandated that the Secretary's duties had to be performed by the department's senior-most confirmed official.

Wolf was confirmed as Under Secretary on November 13, 2019, on a 54–41 vote. He was sworn in as Acting Secretary the same day.

Dispute

On November 15, 2019, House Democrats Bennie Thompson and Carolyn Maloney requested that the Comptroller General of the United States review the legality of Wolf's appointment on the basis that former Acting Secretary Kevin McAleenan did not have authority to change the department's line of succession, asserting that former Secretary Nielsen had not properly placed McAleenan first in the line of succession before resigning and that McAleenan's change came after the 210-day limit to his authority had expired.

In July 2020, University of Michigan law professor Nina Mendelson, an expert on federal vacancies, stated that an acting secretary can serve for only 210 days following a vacancy left by a Senate-confirmed officeholder. The last Senate-confirmed DHS Secretary, Kirstjen Nielsen, stepped down on April 10, 2019, 469 days earlier.

On August 14, 2020, the Government Accountability Office (GAO) released a finding that Wolf had become Acting Secretary improperly, noting that: 
Upon Secretary Kirstjen Nielsen's resignation on April 10, 2019, the official who assumed the title of Acting Secretary had not been designated in the order of succession to serve upon the Secretary's resignation. Because the incorrect official assumed the title of Acting Secretary at that time, subsequent amendments to the order of succession made by that official were invalid and officials who assumed their positions under such amendments, including Chad Wolf and Kenneth Cuccinelli, were named by reference to an invalid order of succession.Under the valid line of succession, the acting secretary would be Director of the Cybersecurity and Infrastructure Security Agency Chris Krebs.

A number of federal courts later ruled that Wolf's appointment was invalid for reasons similar to those given by the GAO. On September 11, 2020, federal judge Paula Xinis ruled that Wolf was likely unlawfully serving as acting secretary of the Department of Homeland Security. On that basis, the court issued an order barring the enforcement of rules Wolf had created. Likewise, on November 14, 2020, federal judge Nicholas Garaufis ruled that Wolf was not lawfully serving as acting secretary of Department of Homeland Security. On that basis, the court invalidated his suspension of DACA. On January 8, 2021, Judge James Donato of the U.S. District Court for the Northern District of California became the fifth judge to rule that Wolf was not lawfully acting as the Acting Secretary of Homeland Security.

Nomination to permanent appointment
On August 24, 2020, Trump announced that he would nominate Wolf as the permanent Secretary of Homeland Security. Wolf was expected to continue to serve as Acting Secretary during the confirmation process, as his acting appointment was made under the Homeland Security Act of 2002 and not the Federal Vacancies Reform Act of 1998, which prevents most nominees from simultaneously acting in the same position. On September 10, 2020, the nomination was formally submitted to the Senate. On September 23, 2020, Wolf appeared before the Senate Committee on Homeland Security and Governmental Affairs. The committee reported his nomination favorably on September 30, but the full Senate took no further action before the end of the 116th Congress.

On January 3, 2021, Wolf's nomination was resubmitted to the 117th Congress, but on January 6, it was formally withdrawn, reportedly around one hour after Wolf called upon Trump to denounce the 2021 storming of the United States Capitol.

Tenure
Trump told aides that he liked Wolf more than his predecessors because his predecessors pushed back on Trump's expansive view of federal power. Wolf was also reported to have a good relationship with White House advisor Stephen Miller. Wolf maintained a low public profile during the early part of his term, prior to his prominent involvement in the deployment of federal law enforcement forces in Portland, Oregon, and elsewhere beginning in July 2020.

In 2017, the U.S. Department of Homeland Security awarded $6,050,000 in contracts to Berkeley Research Group, where Wolf’s wife, Hope Wolf, is an executive, according to a report by NBC News, raising new questions about a potential conflict of interest at the same time Wolf sought Senate confirmation to officially lead the agency. Berkeley Research Group did not receive any DHS contracts until Wolf started at the agency as chief of staff for the Transportation Security Administration.

In February 2020, Wolf announced that the Trump administration was revoking New York residents' ability to participate in Global Entry and other Trusted Traveler programs, in response to the state's "sanctuary" immigration policies, which DHS said jeopardized the government's ability to effectively vet travelers. The move prompted the state of New York to sue the administration. In July 2020, lawyers for the Trump administration informed the court that DHS officials had made false statements to justify excluding New York residents from the Trusted Traveler programs, admitting the inaccuracies "undermine a central argument" in their case. New York subsequently changed its law that had prevented sharing of information with federal law enforcement officers to expressly allow for information-sharing of New York Department of Motor Vehicles records "as necessary for an individual seeking acceptance into a trusted traveler program, or to facilitate vehicle imports and/or exports", and the DHS then removed the Global Entry restrictions.

During his tenure as head of the DHS, Wolf redirected resources in the DHS toward antifa, a loose movement of left-wing agitators. At the time, career DHS officials and other law enforcement agencies emphasized that the major domestic terrorism threats stemmed from far-right groups, not antifa.

According to a whistleblower complaint released in September 2020, Wolf ordered DHS's intelligence branch to stop producing intelligence reports on Russian interference in the 2020 election and not to disseminate those reports because they "made the president look bad". In September 2020, he was publicly accused of having ordered staff to stop reporting on threats from Russia. In spring 2020, communicating through White House national security adviser Robert C. O’Brien, Wolf allegedly ordered former head of DHS intelligence Brian Murphy to focus his reports on Iran and China. He also allegedly told Murphy not to expose the Russian origins of an anti-Biden disinformation campaign because the exposure "made the president look bad". Murphy was demoted in August to DHS management division and filed a whistleblower complaint on September 8, which was released publicly the next day.

In September 2020, Wolf defied a subpoena to testify before the House Committee on Homeland Security. In October 2020, Wolf sent Twitter CEO Jack Dorsey a letter calling on him to "commit to never again censoring content" on Twitter.

On January 11, 2021, Wolf resigned after the storming of the United States Capitol, effective that evening, with FEMA Administrator Pete Gaynor as his replacement. He remained in his Under Secretary position. In his resignation letter, he cited "recent events, including the ongoing and meritless court rulings regarding the validity of my authority as Acting Secretary." Two days after he resigned, Wolf said that Trump was partly responsible for the storming of the Capitol.

2020 deployment of federal forces
In July 2020, Wolf sent about 100 federal agents dressed in camouflage and tactical gear to Portland, Oregon, to help guard the federal courthouse, where they used tear gas on protesters who threw fireworks, frozen water bottles and balloons filled with paint and feces, breaking courthouse windows and setting parts of the courthouse on fire multiple times. Agents also used unmarked vehicles to detain and remove protesters, and the protesters later produced several videos showing that the agents did not identify themselves as law enforcement, although DHS said the agents identified themselves. Legal observers called this "abduction" and "kidnapping". Oregon Governor Kate Brown called the actions an "abuse of power" and accused Wolf of "provoking confrontation for political purposes". Portland Mayor Ted Wheeler called it "an attack on our democracy". Wolf alleged the protesters were a "violent mob" and "violent anarchists". The New York Times reported that an internal DHS memo presented to Wolf before the deployment said the federal agents in question had not been specifically trained in riot control or mass demonstrations. Wolf was criticized for taking unauthorized photographs inside the courthouse, contrary to local and national court policy.

Tom Ridge, the first head of DHS, sharply criticized the deployment, saying, "The department was established to protect America from the ever-present threat of global terrorism. It was not established to be the president's personal militia." Ridge, the former governor of Pennsylvania, added that it would be a "cold day in hell" before he would have consented as a governor to such a deployment.

In a July 21 press conference, Wolf defended the deployment of officers in unmarked military-style uniforms, saying they had identifying numbers on their shoulders. But former Trump administration DHS spokesman David Lapan disputed that the officers are easy to identify, saying, "People like me, who served a long time, have to look very long and hard to figure out who these people are. For the average citizen, it looks like the military is being used to suppress American citizens. Even if that's not the case, and this is law enforcement, it creates the impression that the military is being used." In a Fox News interview on the same day, Wolf claimed it was necessary for the federal government to "proactively arrest individuals".

Personal life
Wolf is married to Hope Wolf and has two sons.

References

External links

|-

1976 births
Living people
American lobbyists
People from Plano, Texas
Plano East Senior High School alumni
Southern Methodist University alumni
Transportation Security Administration officials
Trump administration cabinet members
United States Department of Homeland Security officials